The third USS Baltimore was a side-wheel steamer in the United States Navy.

Baltimore was built in 1848 at Philadelphia, Pennsylvania, captured on the Potomac River between Aquia Creek and Washington, D.C., by the Army on April 21, 1861, turned over to the Navy Department, and commissioned in April 1861, Lieutenant J. H. Russell in command.

Service history
During the American Civil War the Baltimore was used as an ordnance vessel between Washington Navy Yard and nearby ammunition depots. She was also used to ferry Army troops across the Potomac River. On 19 May 1861, she ran aground at the mouth of the Potomac River and was attacked by a Confederate States Navy ram. Nine people were killed. She saw some service with the North Atlantic Blockading Squadron as a dispatch and supply vessel. On May 9, 1862, she transported President Abraham Lincoln, and Secretaries Edwin M. Stanton and Salmon P. Chase, from Fort Monroe to Norfolk, Virginia in an attempt to get a close view of the destroyed Confederate ironclad .

Baltimore was turned over to Norfolk Navy Yard on May 22, 1865, and sold on June 24, 1865, at Washington DC.

References

 

Ships of the Union Navy
Steamships of the United States Navy
Ships built in Philadelphia
1848 ships
Maritime incidents in May 1861